On 10 August 2015, a suicide bombing occurred in the Kabul International Airport street, near the entrance to Kabul Airport, killing 5 people and wounding 16 people. This occurred days after a series of suicide attacks in the Afghan capital killed dozens and wounded hundreds.

The bombing occurred when a suicide bomber drove a vehicle into the first checkpoint on the road into the airport. The people that died included four civilians and a child.

The Taliban claimed responsibility for the attack, and said it was intended to target a group of foreigners.

See also
 War in Afghanistan (2001–present)
 List of terrorist incidents, 2015
 List of terrorist attacks in Kabul

References

2015 murders in Afghanistan
Suicide bombings in 2015
Taliban attacks
Terrorist incidents in Kabul
Terrorist incidents in Afghanistan in 2015
Suicide bombings in Afghanistan
Mass murder in 2015
Mass murder in Kabul
2015 in Kabul
August 2015 events in Afghanistan